Tselina is a rural locality (a settlement) and the administrative center of Tselinsky District of Rostov Oblast, Russia. Population:

References

Rural localities in Rostov Oblast